Hippolytidae is a family of cleaner shrimp, also known as broken-back shrimp or anemone shrimp. The term "broken-back shrimp" also applies to the genus Hippolyte in particular and "cleaner shrimp" is sometimes applied exclusively to Lysmata amboinensis.

Taxonomy
As of 2009, there were 36 genera in the family:

Morphological and genetic studies have recovered the Hippolytidae as polyphyletic, prompting the recognition of Bythocariidae, Lysmatidae, Merguiidae, and Thoridae. , the following genera are included in Hippolytidae sensu stricto in the World Register of Marine Species:

References

 
Decapod families